Charles Clayton Pitcock, Jr. (February 20, 1958 – January 11, 2016) was an NFL and USFL Center and guard who played for both the Tampa Bay Bandits and the Tampa Bay Buccaneers in the 1980s. He was known as "the wild man" when he played for the Bandits because of his extremely passionate play. He was interviewed by award-winning director Mike Tollin for the film Small Potatoes: Who Killed The USFL?, a part of ESPN's 30 for 30 film series. Pitcock was a graduate of Gulf High School in 1976, where he was coached by Kevin White, former athletic director at Duke University. He died in 2016 at the age of 57.

References 

 https://web.archive.org/web/20110610084418/http://www.databasefootball.com/players/playerpage.htm?ilkid=PITCOCHA01

1958 births
2016 deaths
American football offensive linemen
Tulane Green Wave football players
Tampa Bay Buccaneers players
Tampa Bay Bandits players
New Orleans Saints players
Players of American football from Florida
People from Homestead, Florida
Sportspeople from Miami-Dade County, Florida
National Football League replacement players